Forged in Fire is the third studio album by Canadian heavy metal band Anvil, released in 1983.

Track listing

Personnel
Anvil
Steve "Lips" Kudlow – vocals, guitar
Dave Allison – guitar, lead vocals on "Never Deceive Me"
Ian Dickson – bass, backing vocals
Robb Reiner – drums

Production
Chris Tsangarides – producer, engineer
Andrew Warwick, Joe Primeau – assistant engineers
Dean Motter – art direction and design

References

1983 albums
Anvil (band) albums
Albums produced by Chris Tsangarides
Attic Records albums